Phellipe Haagensen Cerqueira (born 26 June 1984 in Rio de Janeiro, Brazil) is a Brazilian actor best known for his role of Bené in the 2002 film, City of God (Cidade de Deus).
He is the younger brother of model and actor Jonathan Haagensen.  He is a member of the band Guerreiros de Jorge.

Credits 
Cidade de Deus (City of God) – 2002
Sonhos de Peixe
Cidade dos Homens (City of Men)
Vidas Opostas (Opposite Lives) 
Mancora – 2008

External links

References

1984 births
21st-century Brazilian male actors
Afro-Brazilian male actors
Brazilian people of Norwegian descent
Living people
Brazilian male film actors
Male actors from Rio de Janeiro (city)
Date of birth missing (living people)